Olympisch Stadion ("Olympic Stadium") may refer to:

 Olympisch Stadion (Antwerp)
 Olympisch Stadion (Amsterdam)